Stanislovas Kęstgaila (1503–1532) was a Lithuanian nobleman, son of Stanislovas Kęsgaila from the Kęsgailos family. Stanislovas Kęstgaila was the Elder of Samogitia (1527–1532) and castellan of Trakai (1528–1532). After marriage to Anna, daughter of Stanisław Kiszka, Stanislovas was the wealthiest magnate in the Grand Duchy of Lithuania.

When Stanislovas was appointed as the Elder of Samogitia in 1527, Grand Duke  Sigismund I the Old limited power and income of the elder as 17 volosts were transferred to Grand Duke's jurisdiction. The elder was left with 8 volosts (Karklėnai, Kražiai, Medingėnai, Patumšiai, Pavandenė, Tendžiogala, Viduklė and Žarėnai) that had only about 10% of the Samogitian population.  After early death of Stanislovas, the office of the Elder of Samogitia was assigned to Piotr Kiszka, not a member of the Kęsgailos family for the first time in more than a century. Stanislovas' last will left about a third of his possessions to the Grand Duke, who then transferred the towns to his wife Bona Sforza. Subsequently the family faded from the public life.

References

1532 deaths
1503 births
Stanislovas
Elders of Samogitia